Jim Bradbury (27 February 1937 – January 2023) was a British historian specialising in the military history of the Middle Ages.

Bradbury lectured in history at Brunel University. He died in January 2023, at the age of 85.

Selected works
 (1975) Shakespeare and his Theatre, Longman, 
 (1985) The Medieval Archer, The Boydell Press, 
 (1988) Introduction to The Buckinghamshire Domesday, Alecto Historical Editions, 
 (1992) The Medieval Siege, The Boydell Press, 
 (1996) Stephen and Matilda: Civil War of 1139-53, Sutton Publishing, 
 (1997) Philip Augustus: King of France, 1180-1223, Longman, 
 (1998) The Battle of Hastings, Sutton Publishing, 
 (2004) The Routledge Companion to Medieval Warfare, London: Routledge, 
 (2007) The Capetians: Kings of France 987-1314, Hambledon Continuum, 
 (2010) Robin Hood, Amberley Publishing, 
 (2021) The Battle of Hastings: The Fall of the Anglo-Saxons and the Rise of the Normans, New York: Pegasus Books,

Collaborations
With Matthew Bennett, Kelly DeVries, Ian Dickie, Phyllis Jestice:
 (2005) Fighting Techniques of the Medieval World, UK:Amber Books,

References

External links
 

1937 births
2023 deaths
20th-century British historians
British medievalists
British military historians
English historians